Kristine Valdresdatter, officially known as NSB Cmb17a or Class 17, was a single railcar built by Strømmens Værksted in 1935. The train has a Buda gasoline prime mover with a mechanical transmission. Originally delivered to the private Valdres Line. The Norwegian State Railways (NSB) took over the line in 1937. It was used on the Numedal Line from 1939 and the Grimstad Line from 1947. After a derailment in 1955, the railcar was retired and has been scrapped.

Specifications
Kristine Valdresdatter was a three-axle railcar, with a bogie at the front and a carrier axle at the back. It had a  Buda gasoline prime mover with a mechanical transmission. The train was built on a steel chassis with a wood and aluminum body. It had a low floor height, easing entry, giving a low center of gravity and thus better driving properties. The train had a seating capacity for 40 plus 5 folding seats in the driver's cab.

History
The class was ordered as the only railcar for the Valdres Line. Built by Strømmens Værksted, it was design-wise similar to the Gullfisk trams which had been delivered to the Oslo Tramway. Kristine Valdresdatter was delivered to the private railway with road number 109. In 1937, the line was taken over by NSB, and the train was given number 18247 and designated Cmb Class 17. As the nationalization resulted in more direct services to Oslo, there was no longer need for the railcar on the line, and it was transferred to the Numedal Line on 21 July 1939. On 12 January 1946, the train was transferred to Stavanger, but was little used. The railcar had a loose tire and procuring a replacement rubber spacer deemed difficult. It was transferred for use on the Grimstad Line on 7 May 1947. On 5 August 1955, the railcar derailed at Fjære, causing a break of axle. The train was therefore set aside, and was decided retired from 7 April 1956. Part of the reason for the early retirement was that the railcar only had a driver's cab in one end, making it difficult to turn. The railcar has been scrapped.

References

17
Vehicles introduced in 1935
Petrol railcars